S.A.S. à San Salvador  (German title: S.A.S. Malko, im Auftrag des Pentagon) is a 1983 French-German international co-production film adaptation of Gérard de Villiers' novel of the same name. The film was directed by Raoul Coutard. It starred Miles O'Keeffe as Son Altesse Sérénissime Malko, the debonair polyglot hero of a long-lived (1965-2013) series of altogether 200 spy novels.

Plot
Like in the books Malko is a nobleman whose family bequeathed him a huge castle and an aristocratic appearance but no sufficient means to sustain the inherited premises or to keep up the appropriate life style. This time it is the castle's roof that requires work and forces Malko to accept another CIA mission. The secret service is worried about rumours which endanger the US-American reputation. It was brought to the CIA's notice that a former collaborator named Enrique Chacon (Raimund Harmstorff) allegedly went rogue in San Salvador. Malko is supposed to investigate Chacon over the atrocities of death squads and then do whatever seems fit against the background of his findings. So he travels to San Salvador and goes about it. Soon he becomes a witness to the crimes of the death squads and eventually he has to realise how Chacon is indeed the driving force for all that. That leaves him no other choice than to render Chacon harmless for good before he can return to his castle and his fiancée, Countess Alexandra (Sybil Danning).

Background
In 1983 spy films were so popular that there were two James Bond films released the very same year – Never Say Never Again (starring Sean Connery) and Octopussy (starring Roger Moore) – while George Lazenby played "J.B." in Return of the Man from U.N.C.L.E. made for television movie. Neither Bond film was convincingly realistic or absolutely true to author Ian Fleming who had once created this hero. The lasting success of novels about Malko showed there was a market for adventures of a newer and younger gentleman spy who refrained from spectacular gadgets. Moreover, Malko's creator Gérard de Villiers would ostentatiously write the script and be one of the producers for all to see that this film was in accordance with his novels. Despite all good intentions S.A.S. à San Salvador didn't establish a new series of spy films but the series of novels lived on all the same, and one-time "Malko" Miles O'Keeffe starred the very next year with Sean Connery in Sword of the Valiant.

Reception
S.A.S. à San Salvador ranked 58th at the 1982 French box office, with 738,685 admissions. In Germany, where it released in early 1983, the film drew a further 250,871 admissions and ranked 65th at the yearly box office.

DVD release
Originally released on Betamax and VHS, the film came out on DVD in 2000.

Cast
 Miles O'Keeffe : Malko Linge
 Raimund Harmstorf : Enrique Chacon
 Dagmar Lassander : Maria Luisa Delgado
 Anton Diffring : Peter Reynolds
 Catherine Jarrett : Rosa
 Monika Kaelin : Pilar
 Alexander Kerst : David Wise
 Corinne Touzet : Elena
 Sybil Danning : Countess Alexandra Vogel
 Franck-Olivier Bonnet : Col. Mendoza
 Robert Etcheverry : Numez Grande
 Wolfgang Finck : Bart Roch
 Didier Bourdon

Discography
The CD soundtrack composed by Michel Magne is available on Music Box Records label (website).

References

External links
 

 
S.A.S. à San Salvador at Cinema français (French)

1982 films
1980s spy thriller films
French spy thriller films
West German films
Films based on French novels
Fictional secret agents and spies
Films about the Central Intelligence Agency
Films based on thriller novels
English-language French films
English-language German films
1980s French films